Massalfassar is a municipality in the comarca of Horta Nord in the Valencian Community, Spain.

References

Municipalities in the Province of Valencia
Horta Nord